Mohamed Soukhane (12 October 1931 – 2 November 2021) was an Algerian footballer who played as a defender for Le Havre and the Algeria national team. He also played for the FLN football team, alongside his younger brother Abderrahmane.

References

1931 births
2021 deaths
Algerian footballers
Association football defenders
Algeria international footballers
FLN football team players
Le Havre AC players
Ligue 2 players
Algerian expatriate footballers
Algerian expatriate sportspeople in France
Expatriate footballers in France
People from Algiers Province
21st-century Algerian people